Brother Beyond were a British pop band who had success in the pop rock genre in the late 1980s.

Biography

The group's first four singles, "I Should Have Lied", "How Many Times", "Chain-Gang Smile" (produced by Don Was), and an early version of "Can You Keep a Secret?", were written by band members Eg White, and David Ben White in collaboration with Carl Fysh. The songs were also performed together by the band members, led by vocalist Nathan Moore. These early singles, released between 1986 and 1988, were minor chart successes in the UK Singles Chart.

When the songwriters and producers Mike Stock, Matt Aitken and Pete Waterman, known as Stock Aitken Waterman (SAW), auctioned off their services to charity, Brother Beyond and label EMI won the auction. The first song to be released from this session was "The Harder I Try", a UK No. 2 hit. The song was succeeded by the song "He Ain't No Competition", getting to No. 6 in the UK. The following releases from the Get Even album failed to make the UK Top Ten. All these singles were taken from the two different editions of their first album Get Even.

After a brief hiatus, they returned with a brand new single in late 1989, "Drive On", which peaked at No. 39 in the UK, from their second album Trust. They then released a cover of the ballad by The Three Degrees, called "When Will I See You Again?", which peaked outside the UK top 40 at No. 43. The final release from their second album was the title track, "Trust", completely self-written, but only peaked at No. 53 in the UK.

EMI America issued the album Trust in the USA mid-1990 adding two new songs which the group recorded in the USA and with a more American sound to break the US market. Both were released as singles there, with the lead single "The Girl I Used to Know" achieving success, peaking at No. 27 on the Billboard Hot 100. Nathan Moore has alleged the band were required to pay £100,000 to the mafia as part of a payola strategy to secure US airplay for the single.  

The follow up single was "Just a Heartbeat Away", released commercially in Australia and as a promotional single in the US, which failed to chart. "The Girl I Used to Know" was released as a non-album single in Europe in early 1991 and peaked at No. 48 in the UK. The group disbanded that same year, with Moore joining another boyband, Worlds Apart.

In January 2011, an expanded edition of Get Even was released, featuring the original line up of the album, along with four bonus tracks. The bonus tracks are extended versions or remixes of "I Should Have Lied", "The Harder I Try", "He Ain't No Competition" and "Be My Twin".

Band members
Nathan Moore (vocals)  – born Nathan Marcellus Moore, 10 January 1965, Stamford Hill, London
David White (guitar) - born David Benjamin White, 6 June 1965, Highbury, London
Carl Fysh (keyboards) - born Carl Anthony Fysh, 25 January 1963, Oxford, Oxfordshire
Steve Alexander (drums) – born Steven Alexander, 20 November 1962, Ystradgynlais, Powys

Former members
 Eg White (bass) – born Francis Anthony White, 22 November 1966

Brother Beyond discography

Albums
Get Even (1988) – UK No. 9, AUS No. 89, GER No. 63
Trust (1989) – UK No. 60
The Very Best of Brother Beyond (compilation, 2005)

Singles

After the split
Lead singer Nathan Moore went on to sing with another boy band, called Worlds Apart, successful in France in the mid-90s, and worked as a manager to such acts as Jessica Garlick. He was also a contestant on ITV's Hit Me Baby One More Time, and part of Lisa Scott-Lee's Totally Scott-Lee programme set up on MTV.

Drummer Steve Alexander toured with Duran Duran for six years, before going solo.  He has since worked with Jeff Beck and formed a musical collaboration called Flashman  with vocalist Renn. His new project is a collaboration with bassist Simon Little called Little Alex.

Carl Fysh now works for Purple PR, a public relations agency in London.  He became manager to male duo Fierce Girl, as well as working with acts including Goldfrapp, Coldplay and Adele.

David White obtained a BA degree in Fine Arts at Central St. Martin's College in London and is currently studying for his Master of Art at Chelsea College of Art and Design. He has shown his paintings all around England and Israel.

Eg and Alice
After leaving Brother Beyond, Eg White formed the duo Eg and Alice with artist Alice Temple. Their production was critically acclaimed but a commercial failure, and none of their singles ever entered the UK Top 75. They released one album (which also didn't chart) for WEA in 1991, before Eg decided to go solo, covering the Jellyfish hit "Stay Home". Eg White won an Ivor Novello award for writing Will Young's "Leave Right Now", and has written songs for a variety of artists including Natalie Imbruglia, Joss Stone and Adele.

Eg and Alice discography
Album
24 Years of Hunger (1991)

Singles
"Indian" (1991)
"Doesn't Mean That Much to Me" (1991)

References

External links
Paul Gambaccini, Tim Rice, Jonathan Rice (1993), British Hit Singles, Guinness Publishing
Moore Official: includes a detailed history and discography of Brother Beyond.
MySpaceTV: short clip of Brother Beyond being interviewed in 1988.

 
English pop music groups
English boy bands
Musical groups established in 1985
Musical groups disestablished in 1991
1985 establishments in the United Kingdom